Nelson's collared lemming (Dicrostonyx nelsoni) is a species of rodent in the family Cricetidae.

It is found in western and southwestern Alaska in the United States.

References

See also
Musser, G. G., and M. D. Carleton. (2005). Superfamily Muroidea. pp. 894–1531 in Mammal Species of the World a Taxonomic and Geographic Reference. D. E. Wilson and D. M. Reeder eds. Johns Hopkins University Press, Baltimore.

 Dicrostonyx
 Mammals described in 1900
 Arctic land animals
 Mammals of the United States
 Endemic fauna of the United States
 Endemic fauna of Alaska
 Mammals of the Arctic
 Taxonomy articles created by Polbot
 Taxa named by Clinton Hart Merriam